The term gold brick or goldbrick is dated American slang for a swindle selling a putative gold bar, by extension a swindle or swindler generally, more generally shrinking (slacking) or a shirker (slacker). It can also refer to:

A gold bar
Goldbricking, the avoidance of work or engaging in personal activities while at work
A US WWII army cartoon written by Dr. Seuss and directed by Frank Tashlin
Gold Bricks, an album by the band Fuck.
Gold Brickers, an enemy group in the video game City of Villains
Gold bricks are special items in several of the  Lego video games
Gold Brick Egg, a chocolate bar manufactured by Elmer Candy Corporation